Huda is an Egyptian film released on November 9, 1959, and based on the play Dark Victory. The film is directed by Ramses Naguib (his debut film) and features a screenplay by Mohamed Abu Youssef- and Hamed Abdel Aziz.

Synopsis
Huda is a cheerful girl who lives with her uncle Ibrahim. Headaches are revealed to be cancer. Kamal, a doctor colleague of her uncle, falls in love with her, but she spurns him, believing it to be out of pity.

External links
 IMDb page
 El Cinema page
 Dhliz page
 Karohat page

References

Egyptian black-and-white films
1959 films
1959 directorial debut films